Affine algebra may refer to:
 Affine Lie algebra, a type of Kac–Moody algebras
 The Lie algebra of the affine group
 Finitely-generated algebra
 Affine Hecke algebra